Lake Michigamme, one of Michigan's largest lakes, reaches a depth of over . Van Riper State Park provides public access. The vast majority of the lake lies in Marquette County, with only its westernmost part extending into Baraga County.

A dam separates the Michigamme River from the main body of the lake at the end of the southern arm. The Spurr River flows into the lake's west end and the Peshekee River flows into the lake in the northeast. Van Riper State Park and Van Riper beach are located at the eastern shoreline of the main arm. The lake is speckled with many islands and rock beds that often creep over the waterline in late summer and fall.

Common fish include smallmouth bass, northern pike, walleye, rock bass, and even whitefish in the deeper parts.

Michigamme is derived from a Native American language meaning " middle large sea".
Michigan is part of the Great Lakes Area, which was colonized by the French, then later sold to the USA. As such, many words & names are French, or French interpretations of Indigenous words & names. Further mistranslated when English came in, later.

See also 
 Trunk Line Bridge No. 1
 Michigamme, Michigan
 List of lakes in Michigan

References 

Lakes of Marquette County, Michigan
Bodies of water of Baraga County, Michigan
Lakes of Michigan
Lake Michigamme